In the United States, fugitive slaves or runaway slaves were terms used in the 18th and 19th centuries to describe people who fled slavery. The term also refers to the federal Fugitive Slave Acts of 1793 and 1850. Such people are also called freedom seekers to avoid implying that the enslaved person had committed a crime and that the slaveholder was the injured party.

Generally, they tried to reach states or territories where slavery was banned, including Canada, or, until 1821, Spanish Florida. Most slave laws tried to control slave travel by requiring them to carry official passes if traveling without an enslaver.

Passage of the Fugitive Slave Act of 1850 increased penalties against runaway slaves and those who aided them. Because of this, some freedom seekers left the United States altogether, traveling to Canada or Mexico. Approximately 100,000 enslaved Americans escaped to freedom.

Laws

Beginning in 1643, slave laws were enacted in Colonial America, initially among the New England Confederation and then by several of the original Thirteen Colonies. In 1705, the Province of New York passed a measure to keep bondspeople from escaping north into Canada.

Over time, the states began to divide into slave states and free states. Maryland and Virginia passed laws to reward people who captured and returned enslaved people to their enslavers. Slavery was abolished in five states by the time of the Constitutional Convention in 1787. At that time, New Hampshire, Vermont, Massachusetts, Connecticut and Rhode Island had become free states.

Constitution
Legislators from the Southern United States were concerned that free states would protect people who fled slavery.
The United States Constitution, ratified in 1788, never uses the words "slave" or "slavery" but recognized its existence in the so-called fugitive slave clause (Article IV, Section 2, Clause 3), the three-fifths clause, and the prohibition on prohibiting the importation of "such Persons as any of the States now existing shall think proper to admit" (Article I, Section 9).

Fugitive Slave Act of 1793
The Fugitive Slave Act of 1793 is the first of two federal laws that allowed for runaway slaves to be captured and returned to their enslavers. Congress passed the measure in 1793 to enable agents for enslavers and state governments, including free states, to track and capture bondspeople. They were also able to penalize individuals with a $500 fine if they assisted African Americans in their escape. The slave hunters were required to get a court-approved affidavit to capture the enslaved person. It resulted in the creation of a network of safe houses called the Underground Railroad.

Fugitive Slave Act of 1850
The Fugitive Slave Act of 1850, part of the Compromise of 1850, was a federal law that declared that all fugitive slaves should be returned to their enslavers. Because the slave states agreed to have California enter as a free state, the free states agreed to pass the Fugitive Slave Act of 1850. Congress passed the act on September 18, 1850, and repealed it on June 28, 1864. The act strengthened the federal government's authority in capturing fugitive slaves. The act authorized federal marshals to require free state citizen bystanders to aid in the capturing of runaway slaves. Many free state citizens perceived the legislation as a way in which the federal government overstepped its authority because the legislation could be used to force them to act against abolitionist beliefs. Many free states eventually passed "personal liberty laws", which prevented the kidnapping of alleged runaway slaves; however, in the court case known as Prigg v. Pennsylvania, the personal liberty laws were ruled unconstitutional because the capturing of fugitive slaves was a federal matter in which states did not have the power to interfere.

Many free state citizens were outraged at the criminalization of actions by Underground Railroad operators and abolitionists who helped people escape slavery. It is considered one of the causes of the American Civil War (1861–1865). Congress repealed the Fugitive Acts of 1793 and 1850 on June 28, 1864.

State laws
Many states tried to nullify the acts or prevent the capture of escaped enslaved people by setting up laws to protect their rights. The most notable is the Massachusetts Liberty Act. This act was passed to keep escaped slaves from being returned to their enslavers through abduction by federal marshals or bounty hunters. Wisconsin and Vermont also enacted legislation to bypass the federal law. Abolitionists became more involved in Underground Railroad operations.

Pursuit

Advertisements and rewards

Enslavers were outraged when an enslaved person was found missing, many of them believing that slavery was good for the enslaved person, and if they ran away, it was the work of abolitionists, with one enslaver arguing that "They are indeed happy, and if let alone would still remain so". (A new name was invented for the supposed mental illness of an enslaved person that made them want to run away: drapetomania.) Enslavers would put up flyers, place advertisements in newspapers, offer rewards, and send out posses to find them. Under the Fugitive Slave Act, enslavers could send federal marshals into free states to kidnap them. The law also brought bounty hunters into the business of returning enslaved people to their enslavers; a former enslaved person could be brought back into a slave state to be sold back into slavery if they were without freedom papers. In 1851, there was a case of a black coffeehouse waiter who federal marshals kidnapped on behalf of John Debree, who claimed to be the man's enslaver.

Capture

Enslavers often harshly punished those they successfully recaptured, such as by amputating limbs, whipping, branding, and hobbling.

Individuals who aided fugitive slaves were charged and punished under this law. In the case of Ableman v. Booth, the latter was charged with aiding Joshua Glover's escape in Wisconsin by preventing his capture by federal marshals. The Wisconsin Supreme Court ruled that the Fugitive Slave Act of 1850 was unconstitutional, requiring states to violate their laws. Ableman v. Booth was appealed by the federal government to the US Supreme Court, which upheld the act's constitutionality.

The Underground Railroad
The Underground Railroad was a network of black and white abolitionists between the late 18th century and the end of the American Civil War who helped fugitive slaves escape to freedom. Members of the Religious Society of Friends (Quakers), African Methodist Episcopal Church, Baptists, Methodists, and other religious sects helped in operating the Underground Railroad.

In 1786, George Washington complained that a Quaker tried to free one of his slaves. In the early 1800s, Isaac T. Hopper, a Quaker from Philadelphia, and a group of people from North Carolina established a network of stations in their local area. In 1831, when Tice David was captured going into Ohio from Kentucky, his enslaver blamed an "Underground Railroad" who helped in the escape. Eight years later, while being tortured for his escape, a man named Jim said he was going north along the "underground railroad to Boston."

Fellow enslaved people often helped those who had run away. They gave signals, such as the lighting of a particular number of lamps, or the singing of a particular song on Sunday, to let escaping people know if it was safe to be in the area or if there were slave hunters nearby. If the freedom seeker stayed in a slave cabin, they would likely get food and learn good hiding places in the woods as they made their way north.

Hiding places called "stations" were set up in private homes, churches, and schoolhouses in border states between slave and free states. John Brown had a secret room in his tannery to give escaped enslaved people places to stay on their way. People who maintained the stations provided food, clothing, shelter, and instructions about reaching the next "station". Often, enslaved people had to make their way through southern slave states on their own to reach them.

The network extended throughout the United States—including Spanish Florida, Indian Territory, and Western United States—and into Canada and Mexico. The Underground Railroad was initially an escape route that would assist fugitive enslaved African Americans in arriving in the Northern states; however, with the passage of the Fugitive Slave Act of 1850, as well as other laws aiding the Southern states in the capture of runaway slaves, it became a mechanism to reach Canada. Canada was a haven for enslaved African-Аmericans because it had already abolished slavery by 1783. Black Canadians were also provided equal protection under the law. The well-known Underground Railroad "conductor" Harriet Tubman is said to have led approximately 300 enslaved people to Canada. In some cases, freedom seekers immigrated to Europe and the Caribbean islands.

Harriet Tubman
One of the most notable runaway slaves of American history and conductors of the Underground Railroad is Harriet Tubman. Born into slavery in Dorchester County, Maryland, around 1822, Tubman as a young adult, escaped from her enslaver's plantation in 1849. Between 1850 and 1860, she returned to the South numerous times to lead parties of other enslaved people to freedom, guiding them through the lands she knew well. She aided hundreds of people, including her parents, in their escape from slavery. Tubman followed north–south flowing rivers and the north star to make her way north. She preferred to guide runaway slaves on Saturdays because newspapers were not published on Sundays, which gave her a one-day head-start before runaway advertisements would be published. She preferred the winters because the nights were longer when it was the safest to travel. Tubman wore disguises. She sang songs in different tempos, such as Go Down Moses and Bound For the Promised Land, to indicate whether it was safe for freedom seekers to come out of hiding. Many people called her the "Moses of her people." During the American Civil War, Tubman also worked as a spy, cook, and a nurse.

Notable people
Notable people who gained or assisted others in gaining freedom via the Underground Railroad include:

 Henry "Box" Brown
 John Brown (abolitionist), who would later lead the 1859 raid on Harper's Ferry. He had a hidden room in his tannery building for fugitive slaves.
 Owen Brown, father of John Brown
 Elizabeth Margaret Chandler
 Levi Coffin
 Frederick Douglass
 Calvin Fairbank
 Thomas Garrett
 Shields Green
 Laura Smith Haviland
 Lewis Hayden
 Josiah Henson
 Isaac Hopper
 Roger Hooker Leavitt
 Samuel J. May
 Dangerfield Newby
 John Parker
 John Wesley Posey
 John Rankin
 Alexander Milton Ross
 David Ruggles
 Samuel Seawell
 James Lindsay Smith
 William Still
 Sojourner Truth
 Harriet Tubman
 Charles Augustus Wheaton

Communities

Colonial America
 Spanish Florida
 Fort Mose
 British Florida
 Negro Fort

United States
 List of Freedmen's towns

Civil War
 Camp Greene (Washington, D.C.) - Civil war camp
 Theodore Roosevelt Island - Civil war camp

Canada
 Africville - Nova Scotia
 Birchtown - Nova Scotia
 Dawn settlement - Ontario
 Elgin settlement - Ontario
 Fort Malden - Ontario 
 Queen's Bush - Ontario

See also

 Abolitionism
 Maroon (people), African refugees who escaped slavery in the Americas and formed settlements
 Slave Trade Compromise and Fugitive Slave Clause

References

Sources

External links
 Maap.columbia.edu 
 Spartacus-educational.com
 Nps.gov
 Slavenorth.com
 Pbs.org
 Slaveryamerica.org
Freedom on the Move (FOTM), a database of Fugitives from American Slavery
 Library.thinkquest.org
 Query.nytimes.com
 Wicourts.gov
 Eca.state.gov
 "Millard Fillmore on the Fugitive Slave and Kansas-Nebraska Acts: Original Letter", Shapell Manuscript Foundation

19th century in the United States
19th century in Canada
Escapees from American detention
 
Slavery in the United States
Canada–United States border
Underground Railroad